Chapter One is the debut album by Collage, released on June 10, 1994, by the label Viper/Metropolitan Records.

Three singles were released — "I'll Be Loving You", the most successful single from the album, reaching No. 56 on the Billboard Hot 100, "Gangster of Love" and "Diana".

Track listing

Charts
Singles - Billboard

References

1994 debut albums
Collage (American duo) albums